XEW-AM is a radio station in Mexico City, Mexico, broadcasting on the AM frequency of 900 kHz; it is branded as W Radio. XEW-AM serves as the originating station for other "W Radio" stations around Mexico that carry some of its programs. The programming on XEW-AM is also simulcast on Mexico City FM radio station 96.9 XEW-FM.

History
XEW began regular broadcasts at 20:00 CST on September 18, 1930. Broadcasting from a room (later to become a proper studio) at the Olympia Cinema on 16 September Street in Mexico City, it initially had only 5 kW of transmitter power, although this was increased to 50 kW by 1934. With the installation of new transmitters, the power became 250 kW by 1935 and remained there for more than 80 years, making XEW-AM the most powerful AM radio station in North America. On February 10, 2016, XEW-AM was approved to relocate its transmitter to a site in Los Reyes Acaquilpan, La Paz Municipality, in the State of Mexico and to reduce power to 100,000 watts.

It was the first Mexico City station in Emilio Azcarraga Vidaurreta's Chain of the Americas, the forerunner to today's Televisa whose radio unit still owns XEW-AM.  XEW-AM originally was affiliated with the NBC Radio Networks (NBC and Blue); its future sister stations would take affiliation with rival networks, XEQ-AM with CBS and XEX-AM with Mutual.  As radio in Mexico evolved with the country's growth and more radio stations signed on, XEW-AM became flagship to the country's largest radio network.  Several radio and television stations have derived their call signs from XEW radio and television, all of them affiliated at one time or another with Televisa.

In the United States, the call letters for KXEW, a commercial AM radio station in Tucson, Arizona, owned by Pan American Radio Corporation, that went on the air May 10, 1963, were chosen by its president and CEO, J. Carlos McCormick, because of his admiration of Azcarraga, whom he had met as a teenager during a 1950 visit to Mexico City.

XEW-FM 
The FM frequency, 96.9, received its concession on April 28, 1962; it was not launched until the 1970s, and by the end of that decade, it carried a disco format. By 1981, it had changed to "Rock Stereo". On September 9, 1985, it was renamed "WFM" with an English rock and pop format, being the direct competition of XHSON-FM (then known as "Rock 101"). Among the DJs that conformed the station were Alejandro González Iñárritu, Martha Debayle and Charo Fernández.

After 14 years, in 1999, the station changed its name and format to "W Radical", directed by the former head of "Rock 101", Luis Gerardo Salas, airing electronic music and eurodance. By 2001, it returned to its former WFM format with the slogan "Frecuencia Adictiva", but in late 2002, after the association of Televisa Radio and PRISA, it was decided to simulcast the same programming on AM and FM, and thus XEW-FM became a news and talk outlet, albeit musical programming can still be heard on overnights and weekends when there are not sports scheduled.

Personalities
 Manuel "Maber" Bernal
 Emilio Tuero
 Juan Arvizu
 Luis Arcaráz
 Nicolás Urcelay
 Alfonso Ortiz Tirado
 Los Panchos
 Juan García Esquivel
 Mario Ruiz Armengol
 Maria Luisa Landín
 María Victoria
 Mario Moreno Cantinflas
 Germán Valdés "Tin-Tan"
 José Sabre Marroquín
 Agustín Lara
 Toña la Negra
 Angelines Fernández
 Carmen Rey
 Pedro Infante
 Jorge Negrete
 Pedro Vargas
 Gustavo Adolfo Palma from Guatemala
 Fernando Fernández
 Eulalio González "Piporro"
 Francisco Gabilondo Soler ("Cri-Cri")
 Hugo Avendaño, Amparo Montes
 Héctor Martínez Serrano
 Antonio Aguilar
 Paco Stanley

External links
XEW-AM, official page

References

Radio stations in Mexico City
Radiópolis
News and talk radio stations in Mexico
Radio stations established in 1930
Clear-channel radio stations